Colleen O'Brian is an Oakland County Circuit judge who ran with the Republican endorsement for the Michigan Supreme Court in 2012.  She lost in the general election.

O'Brian has a bachelor's degree from the University of Michigan and a law degree from the Detroit College of Law.  She became a judge of the 6th Circuit, that covers Oakland County, in 1998.

After Diane Hathaway resigned from the Michigan Supreme Court amid fraud charges O'Brien was seen as a strong candidate to replace her.  The appointment eventually went to David Viviano of Macomb County.

Sources
Oakland Circuit page on O'Brien
Sixth Circuit page on O'Brien
Free Press article on O'Brien

Living people
American women judges
University of Michigan alumni
Detroit College of Law alumni
Michigan state court judges
Year of birth missing (living people)
21st-century American women